Adolf Lauda (25 September 1918 – 12 October 2006) was an Austrian equestrian. He competed in two events at the 1956 Summer Olympics.

References

External links
  

1918 births
2006 deaths
Austrian male equestrians
Olympic equestrians of Austria
Equestrians at the 1956 Summer Olympics